The Kresy myth is a view of the former eastern borderlands of Poland (Kresy) as a  multicultural land dominated by Polish culture.  According to Andrii Portnov, the Kresy is seen as the lost paradise' of Poland’s 'civilisational mission at the same time as the location of "bloody and romantic clashes with the Cossacks and Tatars". The Kresy was part of the Polish–Lithuanian Commonwealth and the Second Polish Republic but since 1945 is outside of Poland, in present-day Ukraine, Belarus, Lithuania. The Kresy, in the Polish imagination, extend beyond the areas which became part of interwar Poland. After the territorial losses of World War II, the nostalgia focused on the Vilnius region and East Galicia. Exponents of the discourse tend to focus on Poles living in the Kresy without paying much attention to the region's Ukrainian, Lithuanian, or Belarusian inhabitants.

Mythology
The Kresy myth is an important component of the Polish national mythology. According to Bogusław Bakuła it is a highly orientalist postimperial narrative. Historian  has called for the abandonment of the Kresy myth, calling it historically false, based on notions of Polish cultural superiority over Belarusian, Lithuanian, and Ukrainian culture. The mechanism whereby that self-delusion operated is understandable, but that does not mean it has to be fully accepted." According to Antony Polonsky, this is a particularly harsh view.

Maria Janion compares the Kresy myth to the American frontier myth of the Wild West. Several scholars, including , point out the similarity between the Kresy myth and the German discourse on East Prussia. Kresy is viewed as a "bulwark of Christianity" in the same manner East Prussia was a "bulwark of German-ness". According to Agnieszka Niemojewska, the myth "presents the Polish–Lithuanian Commonwealth not as it really was, but as many would like to remember. A Poland that is strong, respected, safe behind a solid wall of a noble court and armed in a chivalrous ethos. Simply put: Poland that you could love." The militaristic battles fought in the borderlands against various enemies across the centuries led the Kresy myth to grow out of the Sarmatian one. The military element of the myth was developed in the works of Henryk Sienkiewicz.

According to Niemojewska, one of the main sources of the myth was Adam Mickiewicz's Ballads and Romances, which present an alternative truth from Enlightenment rationalism which is based on romanticism and rituals passed down through generations of people. She writes that various Polish authors have used elements of this myth in their work, such as Stanisław Lem (Highcastle, 1966) and Tadeusz Konwicki (A Chronicle of Amorous Accidents, 1974). Even Czesław Miłosz, who usually eschewed sentimental myths, used elements of Kresy mythology when writing about Lithuania. However, Bakuła argues that the fullest expression of the myth is not in literature but in academic and historical publications.

References

Further reading

Polish nationalism
Myths
Polish irredentism

Polish traditions
History of Poland